Uncle Samsik is an upcoming South Korean television series written and directed by Shin Yeon-shick. It stars Song Kang-ho and Byun Yo-han. It is the first drama series for actor Song Kang-ho since his debut.

Synopsis 
Set in the turbulent backdrop of the 1960s. The series depicts the passionate desire and bromance between Uncle Samsik (Song Kang-ho) who “ate three meals a day even during the war” and super-elite Kim San (Byun Yo-han), who write a story of love, trust, or doubt.

Cast

Main 

 Song Kang-ho as Sam-sik: Kim San's partner whom he meets and commits that they will achieve dream together.
 Byun Yo-han as Kim San: the highest elite who graduated from the Korean Military Academy. He changed his major to economics while training in the United States and returns home with a dream of making Korea an industrial country.

Supporting 

 Lee Kyu-hyung as Kang Seong-min: the next leader candidate.
 Seo Hyun-woo as Jung Han-min: an elite soldier from the military.
 Jin Ki-joo as Joo Yeo-jin: Kim San's lover and a wise elite woman.
 Oh Kwang-rok as Joo In-tae: a politician who insists on the national prosperity and peaceful coexistence.
 Oh Seung-hoon as Ahn Gi-cheol: Ahn Yo-seop's youngest son.
 Kim Min-jae as Yoo Yeon-cheol
 Noh Jae-won as Han-soo: the leader of the Seodaemun faction.
 Ryu Tae-ho as Choi Han-rim: a prestigious general who takes care of Kim San.
 Hojo as Rachel Jung: the younger sister of the director Albright Foundation.
 Lee Kwang-hee
 Kim Yul-ho

References

External links 

 

Korean-language television shows
Upcoming television series
Television series set in the 1960s